The National Voting Rights Institute (NVRI) was a non-partisan, non-profit advocacy organization based in Boston, which described itself as "committed to making real the promise of American democracy that meaningful political participation and power should be accessible to all regardless of economic or social status." NVRI was founded in 1996 by attorney John Bonifaz and was involved with campaign finance reform, and other election reforms, as well as defense of voting rights.  In 2006, NVRI signed a formal affiliation agreement with the New York-based organization Demos and worked in collaboration with Demos on many of its projects.

NVRI was lead counsel or co-counsel in a series of lawsuits in the late 1990s and early 2000s arguing that reasonably drawn political campaign spending limits do not violate the U.S. Constitutional protections of free speech.  This campaign was a part of the larger campaign finance reform field.  The campaign came to an end when the Supreme Court in June 2006 struck down Vermont's campaign spending limits law in the case Randall v. Sorrell.  NVRI was co-counsel with the state of Vermont in defending that law.  The Supreme Court had in 1976 struck down congressional campaign spending limits in the Buckley v. Valeo case.  In the summer of 2009, the National Voting Rights Institute formally dissolved, all of its programs having been adopted by Demos.
 
Civil rights organizations in the United States
Non-profit organizations based in Boston